Rolling Vengeance, also known as Monster Truck, is a 1987 exploitation film directed by Steven Hilliard Stern and starring Don Michael Paul and Ned Beatty. The movie follows a truck driver that builds a special, eight-ton truck to help get revenge against the rednecks who killed his family and raped his girlfriend. The film script's initial premise centered on a young boy that created special monster trucks in order to eliminate drunk drivers.

Plot
The five drunken sons of influential local business owner Tiny Doyle have been terrorizing the streets of their small town in their pick-up truck. Local trucker Big Joe Rosso has a wife named Kathy, a son named Joey, and two young daughters named Allison and Kristin. Big Joe and Joey do business with Tiny, delivering liquor to his bar, but that doesn't stop Tiny's son Vic from driving drunk and running Kathy off the road, killing Kathy, Allison, and Kristin. Thanks to Tiny's influence, the local judge sets Vic free after ordering Vic to pay a $300 fine. Lieutenant Sly, one of the local cops, is sympathetic toward the Rosso family, but Sly is about to retire, and Tiny has a lot of clout in this town. Enraged and bereaved, Big Joe goes after Vic, but the Doyles kill Big Joe. After that, they rape Joey's girlfriend Misty. Enraged and frustrated, Joey builds a monster truck out of junked car and truck parts, with seven-foot tall tires, a flame thrower, and a giant retractable combination drill and metal cutter mounted on it. Joey is out to do what the local authorities cannot or will not do...put an end to the Doyles once and for all.

Cast
 Don Michael Paul as Joey Rosso
 Lawrence Dane as Big Joe Rosso
 Ned Beatty as Tiny Doyle
 Lisa Howard as Misty
 Todd Duckworth as Vic Doyle
 Michael J. Reynolds as Lt. Sly Sullivan
 Michael Kirby as Mahoney
 Michael Dyson as Moon Man
 Hugo Dann as Hairlip
 Lawrence King-Phillips as Finger
 Alan C. Peterson as Four Eyes
 Barclay Hope as Steve Tyler
 Susan Hogan as Kathy Rosso
 Alyson Court as Allison Rosso
 Marsha Moreau as Kristin Rosso

Reception
Reception for the film has been mixed, with most reviews upon its initial release being negative. Twitch Film gave a mostly positive review for Rolling Vengeance, stating that although the film didn't go against any genre conventions, it does "play all the right notes to their hilt". Dread Central also praised the film, commenting that it was "a cult film just waiting to be rediscovered". The San Jose Mercury News panned the film, calling it "predictable".

References

External links
 

1980s exploitation films
Trucker films
1980s road movies
1980s crime drama films
1987 films
Films directed by Steven Hilliard Stern
English-language Canadian films
Canadian action thriller films
Canadian vigilante films
Canadian films about revenge
Rape and revenge films
1980s English-language films
1980s Canadian films